Pietro Maria Borghese (1599 - 15 June 1642) was an Italian Catholic Cardinal.

Early life

Borghese was born in 1599 in Siena, the son of Marcantonio Borghese and Camilla Orsini. Despite the rampant nepotism that was to later define papal politics of the 17th century, Borghese received no particular benefits from his great uncle Pope Paul V whose reign continued until 1621. Maffeo Barberini, however, was raised to the cardinalate by Pope Paul and felt a need to recognise the Borghese family with a similar honour. When he was elected to the papal throne as Pope Urban VIII in 1623, he set about repaying those who had advanced his own career.

Cardinalate

So it was that Borghese was elevated to Cardinal by Pope Urban VIII the following year, on 7 October 1624 and was appointed cardinal-deacon of the church of San Giorgio in Velabro. He was also appointed commendatario of three "rich" abbeys from which he could benefits and income. In 1626 he was appointed cardinal-deacon of Santa Maria in Cosmedin.

In 1633 he was appointed Cardinal-protector of Flanders and he opted for the title of the San Crisogono pro illa vice deaconry in 1636. In 1638 he was appointed Cardinal-protector of the Republic of Genoa. He held both protectorate positions until his death.

He died on 15 June 1642 in Rome and was buried in the Borghese chapel in the Liberian Basilica.

References

1599 births
1642 deaths
17th-century Italian cardinals
Cardinals created by Pope Urban VIII
People from Siena
Pietro Maria